Agriphiloides is a genus of moths of the family Crambidae. It contains only one species, Agriphiloides longipalpellus, which is found in Syria.

References

Crambinae
Monotypic moth genera
Moths of Asia
Crambidae genera